This is a list of Portuguese telenovelas.

 
Portuguese